The 2021 G20 Rome summit was the sixteenth meeting of the Group of Twenty (G20), which was held in Rome, the capital city of Italy, on 30–31 October 2021.

Participating leaders

Invited guests

Absent leaders
Five leaders did not attend the G20 summit. Of them, Chinese leader Xi Jinping and Russian President Vladimir Putin participated via video link; Mexican President Andrés Manuel López Obrador, who rarely leaves the country on foreign trips, sent his Secretary of Foreign Affairs Marcelo Ebrard on his behalf; and Japanese Prime Minister Fumio Kishida and South African President Cyril Ramaphosa both skipped the summit due to elections being held in each respective nation.

Outcomes
The Biden administration and the European Union reached an agreement on 30 October to roll back the steel and aluminium tariff regime that had been imposed by the Trump administration in 2018. The agreement retained some protection for American steel and aluminum producers by adopting a tariff-rate quota regime. It also ended retaliatory tariffs on American goods the EU had imposed and cancelled a scheduled tariff increase by the EU.

See also
 2020 G20 Riyadh summit
 List of G20 summits

References

External links

 Official website of the G20 

2021 conferences
2021 in international relations
21st-century diplomatic conferences (Global)
2020s in Rome
Diplomatic conferences in Italy
Events in Rome
2021 Rome
October 2021 events in Italy